Sarna is an Indian surname of Punjabi Khatri origin. Notable people with the surname include:
Dheeraj Sarna, Indian actor and producer
Jatin Sarna (born 1984), Indian actor
Mohinder Singh Sarna (1923–2001), Indian novelist
Mohinder Singh Sarna, also known as S. Mohinder, Indian music director
Navtej Sarna (born 1957), Indian author-columnist and diplomat

Punjabi-language surnames
Indian surnames
Surnames of Indian origin
Hindu surnames
Khatri clans
Khatri surnames